East Harriet is a neighborhood in the Southwest community in Minneapolis. Its boundaries are West 36th Street to the north, Lyndale Avenue South to the east, West 46th Street to the south, and Lake Harriet, Lakewood Cemetery, and William Berry Parkway to the west.

The home of Theodore Wirth, longtime architect of the Minneapolis park system, is located on the west side of this neighborhood.

Schools 

 Lyndale Community School (K-5), 312 West 34th Street, Minneapolis, MN 55408 : (612) 668-4000 : Map
Ramsey Middle School (6-8), 1 West 49th Street Minneapolis, MN 55419 : (612) 668.0455 Map
Washburn Senior High School (9-12), 201 West 49th Street, Minneapolis, MN 55419-5588 : (612) 668-3400 : Map

Businesses
 Businesses in East Harriet

References

External links
Minneapolis Neighborhood Profile - East Harriet
East Harriet Farmstead Neighborhood Association
Lyndale Community School
Families Building Community
Experience Southwest : Southwest Minneapolis Business Directory (NEHBA Sponsored)

Neighborhoods in Minneapolis